Nguyen Van Ty may refer to:
 Nguyễn Văn Tỵ (1917–1992), Vietnamese painter
 Nguyễn Văn Tý (1925–2019), Vietnamese composer
 Nguyễn Văn Tý (swimmer), in Short course swimming at the 2009 Asian Indoor Games
 Louise Nguyẽ̂n Văn Tỵ (1915-?), Vietnamese composer